HMS Lowestoft was a  light cruiser built for the Royal Navy in the 1910s. She was a member of the Birmingham sub-class of the Town class. She survived World War I and was sold for scrap in 1931.

Design and description
The Birmingham sub-class were slightly larger and improved versions of the preceding Chatham sub-class.

The primary improvement of the Birminghams over the Chathams was the introduction of lighter, easier to work, BL 6-inch (152 mm) Mk XII guns. The lighter guns allowed the addition of another weapon forward of the superstructure. One of these guns was mounted on the centreline aft of the superstructure and two more were mounted on the forecastle deck abreast the bridge. The remaining four guns positioned amidships, two on each broadside. All these guns were fitted with gun shields. Four Vickers 3-pounder (47 mm) saluting guns were also fitted. The armament was completed by two submerged 21-inch (533 mm) torpedo tubes.

Construction and career
The ship was laid down on 27 July 1912 by Chatham Royal Dockyard and launched on 28 April 1914. Upon completion in April 1914, Lowestoft was assigned to the 1st Light Cruiser Squadron of the Grand Fleet, and in August 1914 she sank a German merchant ship. On 28 August 1914, she participated in the Battle of Heligoland Bight, and on 24 January 1915 Lowestoft took part in the Battle of Dogger Bank. In February 1915, she was reassigned to the 2nd Light Cruiser Squadron, and in 1916 reassigned again to the 8th Light Cruiser Squadron, operating in the Mediterranean. She survived the war and was sold for scrap on 8 January 1931 to Thos. W. Ward, of Milford Haven.

Notes

Bibliography

External links
 Ships of the Birmingham group
  OldWeather.org transcription of ship's logbooks 19 September to September 1920

 

Town-class cruisers (1910) of the Royal Navy
Ships built in Chatham
1913 ships
World War I cruisers of the United Kingdom